Silver Haze is the second album by the American punk band Aye Nako, released via Don Giovanni Records on April 7, 2017.

In contrast to the band's earlier work, the album's songwriting is split between singer Mars Dixon and guitarist Jade Payne.

"Particle Mace" from the album was released as a single.

Track listing

Reception

The album received a 7.9 score from Pitchfork, with Matthew Ismael Ruiz stating it "feels like the best of Aye Nako". Peter Ellman, reviewing for Exclaim!, gave it 8/10, commenting on how the band juxtaposed "at-times-jarring post-punk guitar parts with pretty, melodic, even catchy choruses". William Kennedy of The Portland Mercury called it "bracing and vital ’90s-era guitar rock with elements of pop punk and enough messy, open-chord Sonic Youth-style tunings".

Personnel
 Mars Ganito – vocals, guitar
 Joe McCann – bass guitar
 Jade Payne – guitar
 Sheena McGrath – drums

References

Don Giovanni Records albums
2017 albums